As a mass sports organization had the SV Dynamo also recognized many victories to reach in international competitions. In this list can be seen many athletes which won at least one bronze medal at the European Championships. Among the Dynamo top scorers were:

List

Athletics (track and field) 
 Andreas Oschkenat
 Brigitte Wujak
 Christa Seeliger Fischer
 Christina Brehmer
 Christoph Höhne
 Cornelia Oschkenat
 Detlef Torith
 Detlef Wagenknecht
 Doris Maletzki
 Ellen Fiedler
 Gisela Birkemeyer
 Gisela Köhler
 Hans-Georg Reimann
 Hartmut Briesenick
 Hildrun Claus
 Ines Vogelsang
 Jacqueline Todten
 Jörg Pfeifer
 Jutta Kirst
 Kathrin Weßel
 Klaus Beer
 Monika Zehrt
 Rita Kühne
 Roland Wieser
 Romy Müller
 Susanne Beyer
 Wolfgang Schmidt

Biathlon

 André Sehmisch
 Birk Anders
 Dieter Speer
 Eberhard Rösch
 Frank-Peter Roetsch
 Günther Bartnik
 Hans Jörg Knauthe
 Horst Koschka
 Joachim Meischner
 Klaus Siebert
 Manfred Beer
 Matthias Jacob
 Raik Dittrich
 Ralf Göthel
 Wilfried Bock

Boxing

 Bernd Wittenburg
 Detlef Kästner
 Lutz Käsebier
 Frank Kegelbein
 Klaus-Dieter Kirchstein
 Maik Heydeck
 Otto Babiasch
 Peter Tiepold
 Rainer Poser

Cross-country skiing

 Anni Unger
 Christel Meinel
 Dietmar Meinel
 Gabriele Haupt
 Gabriele Meinel
 Gerd Heßler
 Gerd-Dietmar Klause
 Marita Dotterweich
 Marlies Rostock
 Stefan Schicker

Cycling

 Bernd Dittert
 Bill Huck
 Carsten Wolf
 Christa Luding-Rothenburger
 Emanuel Raasch
 Guido Fulst
 Heinz Richter
 Lothar Stäber
 Jan Ullrich
 Jens Fiedler
 Jürgen Schütze
 Manfred Klieme
 Olaf Ludwig
 Peter Gröning
 Rainer Hönisch
 Werner Otto

Figure skating

 Christine Errath
 Heidemarie Steiner
 Manuela Groß
 Rolf Österreich
 Romy Kermer
 Uwe Kagelmann

Fencing

 Mandy Niklaus

Gymnastics

 Andreas Wecker
 Angelika Keilig-Hellmann
 Annelore Zinke
 Birgit Radochla
 Dagmar Kersten
 Dörte Thümmler
 Gabriele Fähnrich
 Irene Abel
 Jürgen Paeke
 Karin Büttner-Janz
 Karola Sube
 Lutz Hoffmann
 Magdalena Schmidt
 Maxi Gnauck
 Michael Nikolay
 Regina Grabolle
 Roland Brückner
 Ulf Hoffmann
 Ulrike Klotz

Handball

 Günter Zeitler
 Heiko Bonath
 Jörg Paulick
 Jürgen Hildebrandt
 Klaus Dieter Matz
 Klaus Petzold
 Rainer Höft
 Rudi Hirsch
 Werner Senger

Ice Hockey

 Bernd Karrenbauer
 Bernd Poindl
 Dieter Voigt
 Erich Novy
 Heinz Schildan
 Helmut Novy
 Joachim Franke
 Joachim Ziesche
 Klaus Hirche
 Manfred Buder
 Rainer Tudyka
 Rüdiger Noack
 Ullrich Noack
 Wolfgang Plotka

Judo

 Andreas Preschel
 Detlef Ultsch
 Dieter Scholz
 Dietmar Höttger
 Dietmar Lorenz
 Frank Borkowski
 Frank Möller
 Fred Ohlhorn
 Günter Krüger
 Günther Wiesner
 Henry Stöhr
 Karl Nitz
 Karl Nietz
 Klaus Henning
 Otto Smirat
 Uwe Stock
 Wolfgang Zuckschwerdt

Motocross

 Paul Friedrichs

Nordic Combined

 Günter Deckert
 Heinz Wosipiwo
 Ralph Leonhardt
 Thomas Abratis
 Uwe Dotzauer

Parachuting

 Bernd Wiesner
 Günther Gerhard
 Hans Peter Schmelzer
 Irina Hornig
 Walter Greschner
 Wolfgang Rieding

Riding

 Gerhard Schulz

Rowing

 Anke Borchmann
 Beate Schramm
 Bernd Ahrendt
 Bernd Eichwurzel
 Bernd Höing
 Bernd Krauß
 Bernd Landvoigt
 Bernd Niesecke
 Birgit Peter
 Christa Staak
 Christiane Knetsch
 Daniela Neunast
 Dagmar Holst
 Detlef Kirchhoff
 Dietmar Schiller
 Dietmar Schwarz
 Dietrich Zander
 Eckhard Martens
 Ernst Otto Borchmann
 Frank Dundr
 Frank Klawonn
 Gabriele Kelm
 Gabriele Rotermund
 Gunther Gerhardt
 Hanno Melzer
 Hans Joachim Borzym
 Hans Joachim Puls
 Harold Dimke
 Hartmut Schreiber
 Hendrik Reiher
 Henny Dobler
 Helma Lehmann
 Helmut Hänsel
 Heinrich Mederow
 Henrietta Ebert
 Horst Bagdonat
 Inge Bartlog
 Inge Gabriel
 Ingelohre Bahls
 Irmgard Böhmer
 Irina Müller
 Jana Sorgers
 Jens Köppen
 Joachim Böhmer
 Jörg Friedrich
 Jörg Landvoigt
 Judith Zeidler
 Jutta Lau
 Jutta Hampe
 Jürgen Arndt
 Jürgen Bertow
 Jürgen Kessel
 Jürgen Seyfarth
 Kathrin Haacker
 Karin Luck
 Karl Grzeschuchna
 Karl-Heinz Bußert
 Kathrin Dienstbier
 Katrin Boron
 Karsten Schmeling
 Kerstin Hinze
 Kerstin Toußaint
 Klaus Dieter Ludwig
 Klaus Peter Foppke
 Liane Weigelt
 Manfred Schmorde
 Manfred Schneider
 Martina Schröter
 Margarete Selling
 Marlies Wegner
 Michael Wolfgramm
 Monika Kallies
 Ortwin Rodewald
 Ralf Jobst
 Ramona Balthasar
 Ramona Hein
 Rolf Jobst
 Renate Neu
 Reinhard Gust
 Reinhard Zahn
 Roswitha Zobelt
 Roswitha Reichel
 Rüdiger Reiche
 Sabine Brinker
 Sybille Schmidt
 Thomas Jung
 Ursula Pankraths
 Ursula Wagner
 Ute Stange
 Ute Wild
 Uwe Dühring
 Uwe Kellner
 Viola Goretztki
 Wolfgang Welner

Shot put

 Hartmut Briesenick
 Marianne Adam

Shooting Sports
 Behm
 Bernhardt Hochwald
 Dieter Monien
 Faust Steinbrück
 Gerhard Dommrich
 Jörg Damme
 Marlies Moch-Binder
 Martin
 Metelmann
 Norbert Klaar
 Olaf Hess
 Peter Gorewski
 Regina Petzke

Ski Jumping

 Andreas Kunz
 Harry Glaß
 Henry Glaß
 Klaus Ostwald
 Manfred Deckert
 Matthias Buse

Soccer

 Artur Ullrich
 Bernd Jakubowski
 Bodo Rudwaleit
 Dieter Riedel
 Frank Ganzera
 Frank Terletzki
 Gert Heidler
 Gerd Weber
 Hans-Jürgen Dörner
 Hans-Jürgen Kreische
 Hans-Jürgen Riediger
 Hartmut Schade
 Norbert Trieloff
 Reinhard Häfner
 Reinhard Lauck
 Siegmar Wätzlich
 Wolf-Rüdiger Netz

Speed skating

 Andre Hoffmann
 Angela Stahnke
 Helga Haase
 Karin Kessow
 Ruth Schleiermacher
 Sabine Brehm
 Sabine Becker
 Sylvia Albrecht
 Uwe Jens Mey

Swimming

 Andre Matzk
 Andrea Eife
 Caren Metschuck
 Detlev Grabs
 Evelyn Stolze
 Frank Pfütze
 Peter Bruch
 Jörg Woithe
 Jürgen Schütze
 Katrin Meissner
 Kerstin Kielgaß
 Lars Hinneburg
 Lutz Unger
 Manuela Stellmach
 Rosemarie Gabriel
 
 Roswitha Beier
 Roswitha Krause
 Steffen Zesner
 Sven Lodziewski
 Sylvia Gerasch
 Ursula Küper

Volleyball

 Anke Westendorf
  Ariane Radfan
 Barbara Czekalla
 Christine Mummhardt
 Heike Lehmann
 Manuela Groß
 Wolfgang Webner
  Schwarz
 Katharina Bullin

Water polo

 Hans-Georg Fehn
 Hans-Ulrich Lange
 Jürgen Kluge
 Jürgen Schüler
 Rolf Bastel
 Siegfried Ballerstedt
 Wolfgang Zein

Wrestling

 Dieter Heuer
 Fred Hempel
 Gerald Brauer
 Hans-Dieter Brüchert
 Harald Büttner
 Karl-Heinz Stahr
 Karl Nitz
 Karsten Polky
 Klaus Pohl
 Roland Gehrke
 Roland Dudziak
 Torsten Wagner
 Uwe Westendorf

See also 
 List of Dynamo sports society athletes

References 

SV Dynamo
SV Dynamo
Lists of East German sportspeople